Duoyuan Global Water is a China-based company that specializes in manufacturing water and waste water treatment equipment. Duoyuan has been around since 1992, providing over 100 types of products and treatment solutions for municipal, industrial, residential and agricultural water systems. Over two decades ago, Duoyuan created the first water treatment apparatus in China, and it has since won awards for its important products and treatment mechanisms.

History

Duoyuan was founded in 1992. It built a manufacturing facility in Beijing in 1994. Production of water purifying equipment began in 1998. An additional manufacturing facility was built in Langfang in 2000.

Duoyuan began production of sewage and waste water treatment equipment in 2001. In 2003 it established a postdoctoral water treatment and R&D center.

In 2009, Duoyuan Global Water, Inc. becomes the only water treatment equipment manufacturing company from China listed on the New York Stock Exchange, with an initial public offering on June 29 of $16.00 per share.

Scandal
in 2011, Duoyuan announced the resignation of four members of the company's Board of Directors amidst allegations of fraudulent internal company controls. Duoyuan engaged international law firm Baker & McKenzie and an international accounting firm to conduct an internal investigation and review of the company.

Although Duoyuan Global Water has been accused of securities fraud in a class action lawsuit against the company, this is still in litigation and no formal ruling has been made yet. "We are optimistic that the newly appointed Special Investigation Committee will be able to work quickly towards a thorough and an early completion of their investigation," stated Mr. Wenhua Guo, the newly appointed chairman of the board of directors.

References

External links 
 Duoyuan Global Water Securities Class Action Website
 Duoyuan Global Water Website
 Key Equipment Duoyuan Global Water Provides
 Law Firm Representing Duoyuan Global Water Shareholders
 DGW US Equity Stock Information
 Class Action Lawsuit Notice
 Duoyuan Global Water Patent List and Important National Products
 SEC Duoyuan Global Water Company Filings
 BusinessWire search: Halter USX China Index Information

Companies listed on the New York Stock Exchange
Manufacturing companies established in 1992
Manufacturing companies of China
Chinese companies established in 1992